(2 September 1889 – 16 October 1962) was a Japanese diplomat and politician who was briefly foreign minister of Japan from September 1942 to 21 April 1943 during World War II.

Career
Tani was a career diplomat before assuming ministerial roles. More specifically, he was Japanese ambassador to France (1918-1923), to the US (1927–1930) and to Manchukuo (1933–1936). In addition, he was chief of Asian Bureau in the ministry of foreign affairs. He also worked as counsellor to the Japanese embassy in Hsinking and as ambassador-at-large in China.

He served as vice minister of foreign affairs in the cabinet of Mitsumasa Yonai when appointed under then foreign minister Kichisaburō Nomura on 24 September 1939.

Then Tani served as information chief and also, foreign minister in the cabinet of Hideki Tōjō. He was appointed foreign minister on 17 September 1942. During his tenure, Japan continued to encourage a separate peace between Germany and the Soviet Union. However, his term was short. Since bureaucrats in the ministry of foreign affairs resented Tani, on 21 April 1943, he was replaced by Mamoru Shigemitsu. After that, he received Shigemitsu's former post of Japanese ambassador in Nanjing to the Reorganized National Government of China.

After World War II, Tani was detained as a suspect of war crimes until December 1948. However, he was not convicted. Then he served again as Japan's ambassador to the United States from March 1956 to April 1957, becoming the third post-war ambassador of Japan to the US.

Personal life
Tani was married and had three children, a daughter and two sons.

References

External links
 

1889 births
1962 deaths
University of Tokyo alumni
People from Kumamoto Prefecture
Foreign ministers of Japan
Ambassadors of Japan to China
Ambassadors of Japan to France
Ambassadors of Japan to the United States